is a passenger railway station located in the town of Masaki, Ehime Prefecture, Japan. It is operated by the private transportation company Iyotetsu.

Lines

Layout
The station consists of a single island platform. It used to be an unmanned station surrounded by farmland, but since Emifull MASAKI, a large shopping center, opened nearby, it was staffed in September 2008 after installing a simple station staff office and a toilet. During most of the day, trains arrive every fifteen minutes.

History
The station was opened on March 9, 1967

Surrounding area
 Masaki Park

See also
 List of railway stations in Japan

References

External links

Iyotetsu Gunchū Line
Railway stations in Ehime Prefecture
Railway stations in Japan opened in 1967
Masaki, Ehime